KVLA-FM (90.3 MHz) is a public radio station owned by American Public Media Group, through its Southern California Public Radio subsidiary. Licensed to Coachella, California, it serves Palm Springs, the Coachella Valley, and surrounding areas.

KVLA-FM generally simulcasts 89.3 FM KPCC, based in Pasadena, California.  It carries such NPR shows as All Things Considered, Morning Edition and Fresh Air, along with news and features from KPCC's news department.

History

The 90.3 frequency in Coachella was first filed for in March 1997. A construction permit was granted in February 2003, and the call sign KBXO was selected on February 18 as its owner readied it to become a fully licensed radio station. In February 2005, the station signed on with a Christian radio format from the Oasis Network; it was owned by the Creative Educational Media Corp.

The Creative Educational Media Corp. sold KBXO to American Public Media Group for $1 million in June 2008. On August 22, 2008, the Christian format was dropped and the station started acting as a satellite for KPCC. The call sign was changed to KPCV with the change in format. The call sign was changed again on October 14, 2011, to the current KVLA-FM.

References

External links

American Public Media Group
NPR member stations
VLA-FM
Mass media in Riverside County, California
Coachella, California
VLA-FM
Radio stations established in 2005
2005 establishments in California